Michael Joseph (26 September 1897 – 15 March 1958) was a British publisher and writer.

Early life and career
Joseph was born in Upper Clapton, London. He served in the British Army during the First World War, and then embarked on a writing career, his first book being Short Story Writing for Profit (1923).

After a period as a literary agent for Curtis Brown, Joseph founded his own publishing imprint as a subsidiary of Victor Gollancz Ltd. Gollancz invested £4000 in Michael Joseph Ltd, established 5 September 1935. Joseph and Victor Gollancz disagreed on many points and Michael Joseph bought out Gollancz Ltd in 1938 after  Gollancz attempted to censor Across the Frontiers by Sir Philip Gibbs on political grounds. (Joseph published the first edition in 1938 and a revised edition the following May.) Joseph managed to build up an impressive list of authors, including  H. E. Bates, C. S. Forester, Monica Dickens and Richard Llewellyn.

Personal life
Joseph married actress Hermione Gingold  in 1918 and they had two sons, Leslie and Stephen Joseph. (The Stephen Joseph Theatre in Scarborough, established by the latter in 1955, was Britain's first theatre in the round.) The couple divorced in 1926 and Joseph promptly married Edna Victoria Nellie Frost, with whom he had a daughter Shirley and son Richard. Richard established a very successful career in printing and then later running his own publishing company. He and his wife, Elizabeth, had a son, Adam Joseph and daughter, Rachel Joseph. Edna died in 1949 and Joseph's third marriage the next year was to Anthea Esther Hodson, with whom he had a daughter Charlotte and son Hugh. Anthea ran the publishing business after her husband's death.

Death
Michael Joseph died of septicaemia after a delayed medical operation in 1958.

Michael Joseph Ltd from 1958
After Joseph died, his widow Anthea Joseph rescued the publishing company Michael Joseph Ltd from the ensuing crisis. In 1985, Michael Joseph Ltd was acquired by Penguin Books. Penguin turned its new property into one of its imprints and in 2018 Penguin describes Michael Joseph as "[t]he leading commercial fiction and non-fiction imprint of Penguin Books", specialising in "women’s fiction, crime, thrillers, cookery, memoirs and lifestyle books".

Books written by Michael Joseph

 Short Story Writing for Profit (London: Hutchinson & Co., 1923)
 Journalism for Profit (1924)
 The Commercial Side of Literature (Hutchinson, 1925)
 How to Write a Short Story (Hutchinson, 1926)
 How to Write Serial Fiction (Hutchinson, 1927); US edition, Holt, 1928, "by Michael Joseph and Marten Cumberland"
 The Magazine Story: with ten examples analysed by Michael Joseph (Hutchinson, 1928)
 The Autobiography of a Journalist (Hutchinson, 1929), ed. and introduced by Joseph The autobiography of a journalist – uncertain role
 Cat's Company (London: Geoffrey Bles, 1930), "illustrations ... are from drawings made by a celebrated German artist, B. F. Dolbin"; later illus. Clare Dawson (Chicago: Ziff-Davis, 1947)
 A Book of Cats, being twenty drawings by Foujita; poems in prose by Michael Joseph (New York: Covici-Friede, 1930), artwork by Tsuguharu Foujita
 This Writing Business (Faber & Faber, 1931), 32 pp
 Puss in Books: A Collection of Stories about Cats (New York: Dodd, Mead & Company, 1932), ed. Elizabeth Drew and Joseph, illus. A. R. Wheelan
 Heads or Tails (1933), with Selwyn Johnson
 Discovery, A Play in Three Acts (Gollancz, 1934)
 Kittens and Cats (Racine: Whitman, 1938)
 The Sword in the Scabbard (Joseph, 1942)
 Charles: The Story of a Friendship (Joseph, 1943), 91 pp.
 Complete Writing for Profit (London: Hutchinson & Co., 1938), 1097 pp.
 The Adventure of Publishing (London: Allan Wingate, 1949)
 Best Cat Stories (Faber, 1952), ed. Joseph, illus. Eileen Mayo

Authors and series published by Michael Joseph Ltd
Authors on Michael Joseph Ltd.’s list included H. E. Bates, Vicki Baum, Joyce Cary, Monica Dickens, C. S. Forester, Paul Gallico, Richard Gordon, Barry Hines, D. F. Karaka, Richard Llewellyn, Bertrand Russell, Vita Sackville-West and Derek Tangye.

Book series published by the firm included the Carfax Editions, Mermaid Books, The Minack Chronicles and The Rosemary Library.

References

Further reading
 Richard Joseph, Michael Joseph: Master of Words, Shedfield, Hampshire: Ashford Press Publishing, 1986. Introduction by Monica Dickens.

External links
 

1897 births
1958 deaths
Publishers (people) from London
English memoirists
English self-help writers
People from Upper Clapton
Deaths from sepsis
British Army personnel of World War I
20th-century English businesspeople